Robin Page (2 November 1932 – 12 May 2015) was a British painter. He was one of the early members of the Fluxus art movement.

Biography
Page was born in England in 1932. His father, Peter Carter-Page, was a humorist and cartoonist who worked as an animator at the Disney studios in Hollywood in the 1930s. The family moved to Canada where the young Page lived until the age of 27. Page moved back to Europe in 1959 and after teaching at the revolutionary environment of Leeds College of Art in the north of England until 1967 he moved to Germany found himself in the company of the international network of Fluxus artists, such as Robert Filliou, Dieter Roth, Dorothy Iannone, Daniel Spoerri, Ben Vautier, et al. His artwork embraced the sentiments of the movement. Namely, its 'anti-art' stance, inherited from the Dadaists, and its emphasis on the event as an artwork (called a Happening or an Action Event). Page performed many Happenings, including one titled Guitar, which involved him in kicking his guitar with the help of an audience along the Mall for the ICA's Misfits concert. Other events involved Page making a chalk portrait drawing of Joseph Beuys, complete with begging bowl, on the pavement in front of the National Gallery.

In 1966 he was with Gustav Metzger, Otto Muehl, Wolf Vostell, Yoko Ono and others a participant 
of the Destruction in Art Symposium (DIAS) in London.

By 1970, Page left the Fluxus movement and moved to Germany. He began to develop his own brand of cutting edge art and was one of the first artists to employ humour as a means of overtly challenging notions of 'good taste' in the art world. His Hey Wildon paintings stand as one of Page's alter-ego puppets that mocked and commented on 'art' while at the same time embodied the traditional techniques of painting. Page poses the question " Hey, Whildon, why has humour never replaced seriousness as the most respectable cultural attitude?" to which Whildon replies "Because people can't fake it!"

Page's artwork continued to develop an overtly biting and satirical commentary on cultural pretensions. By 1987 he had "died and gone to Bluebeard" which involved him in dying his beard blue (executed by Mike Spike Froidl - see the appropriate painting here) and producing a series of paintings that appropriate elements from poster and propaganda art. His Bluebeard AMuseum further places Page at the forefront of contemporary art; by both mocking the notion of the Institution and placing himself at the centre of his art 'collection', Page challenges the very basis upon which power is assigned to private and state-run and cultural organisations. One notable example is the painting Freedom is a Burning Brush which features the artist posing as the Statue of Liberty holding a paintbrush as a torch.

Happenings (Action Events)
1962: The Door, London. Art Indicator, London. Guitar Piece, Misfits Concert, ICA, London. Simultaneous Document of the Space Flight of American Astronaut Walter Shira, London.
1963: Plant Piece, Little festival of New Music, London. Two Stones London and the Fluxus Festival, Nice. Wrap-up, BBC, New Comment, London. The Measurement of Motivation, London.
1965: Eclipse, Theatre Royal, Stratford, London. 
1966:  Krow 1, Destruction in Art Symposium, London. Beach Boxes, Scarborough. Merry Christmas '66, Leeds.
1967: Action Lecture on War, Cardiff. Protest March, Leeds.
1968:  Professor Protozoa's Mini Majestic Bilou Road Show Yeah, City of London Festival. The Wild Man of Woburn, Woburn Abbey. Event for Liz, St. Valentine's Eve, Bradford. Concert of Experimental Music, Commonwealth Institute, London.

Exhibitions

Solo exhibitions
1969: Art Intermedia, Cologne
1971: Eat Art Gallery, Düsseldorf
1972: Galerie Muller, Cologne
1973: Kunstverein, Cologne; Galerie Muller, Stuttgart; Galerie Gunter Sachs, Hamburg
1974: Galerie Foncke, Ghent; Salon de Mai, Paris (travelled to Braunschweig, Germany and Lijnbaacentrum, Rotterdam)
1975: Gallery Allen, Vancouver
1977: Junior Galerie, Goslar, Germany; Galerie Vallois, Paris
1979: Galerie Redmann, Sylt, Germany; Akademie der Künste, Berlin
1980: Galerie Redmann, Berlin; Galerie Redmann at ART'80, Basle; Kunsthalle, Darmstadt, Germany
1982: Kunstverein Augsburg, Germany
1993: Galerie Klewan Munich

Group exhibitions
1953: Young West Coast Painters, Vancouver
1954: West Coast Hard Edge, Seattle
1962: Festival of Misfits, Gallery One, London; Richmond Jazz Festival
1963: Ten Year Show, Gallery One, London
1964 Cross Section, City Museum, Leicester; About Round, University of Leeds
1965: 45th Summer Exhibition, Redfern Gallery, London; Structures Vivantes, Redfern Gallery, London; Then & Now, Park Square Gallery, Leeds.
1966: Form& Image, City Museum, Leeds; Destruction in Art, Symposium, Leeds
1967: Concrete/Spatial Poetry, Midland Group Gallery, Nottingham.
1969: Amadou in A, Antwerpen
1970: Happenings & Fluxus, Kunstverein, Koln
1972: Szene Rhein-Ruhr, Museum Folkwang, Essen; Documenta 5, Kassel; Freunde des Museums Sammein (Collections of the Friends of the Museum), Museum Folkwang, Essen
1973: 6th International Triennial of Coloured Graphic Prints, Grenchen Galerie Muller, Koln.

Publications
Paul Gravett, (2007) Pulp Fiction, Hayward Gallery Publishing, Southbank Centre, London
J. Gray, (1993) Action Art, Greenwood Press, CT, USA, 
Karl-Heinz Hering, (1974) Kunstverein fur die Rheinlande und Westfalen, Düsseldorf, Verheyen & Schulte, Düsseldorf
'Art in a Brown Paper Bag', Weekend Magazine (Montreal), May, 1975
'I am a Unique Idiot', Marq de Villiers, Weekend Magazine, (Montreal), May, 1975
'Artist Dips His Brush in Canadian Wry', Art Perry, Vancouver Province, November, 1974
'Everybody Invited', John Anthony Thwaites, Art and Artists, London, November 1974
'Robin Page, Galerie Muller', G. Wirth, Das Kunstwerke, Baden-Baden, July 1973
'A Note on Robin Page', E.Lynn, Art International, Lugano, May 1973
'Robin Page: Bildparabeln, Exhibition Catalogue', Augsburg, 1982
'Mail Art: Communication a Distance', Jean-Marc Poinsot, Paris, 1971
'Robin Page', Flash Art, May 1972

References

Fluxus
British performance artists
1932 births
2015 deaths